A Serra (Star Hill) is a Portuguese telenovela which began airing on SIC on 22 February 2021 and ended on 29 April 2022.

Plot 
Love moves mountains...

When Fátima – a young woman from Serra da Estrela – meets Tomás – the son of a burel factory’s owners – the connection between them is undeniable. However, Tomás is engaged to the girl who has been her rival since they were teenagers – Mariana – and is being blackmailed to stay away from Fátima because of her brother’s (Artur) death.

Devastated by the loss of Artur and her father’s imprisonment, Fátima wants justice, and she will find it, even if she has to go against the most powerful family in Serra. Yet, she will bump into a terrible secret that involves not only the whole village she lives in, but also Carlota, Mariana’s mother, who is going to do everything so that truth never comes out.

Star Hill is a rural telenovela set in the mountains, in a remote village from Serra da Estrela, Portugal, where everyone knows each other. Remoteness and the hard life they have makes them feel part of a community. A plot that stands out for its mountain’s scenario and invite us to return to nature through characters that portray the search for beauty, security and Serra’s tranquility. 
A story about love and fight for justice, where the simple and genuine protagonist will be surprised with a breathtaking passion, but also with the secret of a collective crime, covered by people that she knows well: friends and enemies, rich and poor, good and bad. Most people in the village work and depend somehow on Pereira de Espinho’s family business, who run the most famous hotel in the mountain and are also Mariana’s parents, the antagonist. Fátima will cross path with Carlota, a powerful and dishonest woman, who has everything to lose with our heroin’s investigation. 
Star Hill is a narrative framed by mystery, where two women that could not be more different, fight for the love of one man.

Cast

Guest cast

References

External links
 

2021 Portuguese television series debuts
2022 Portuguese television series endings
Portuguese telenovelas
2021 telenovelas
Sociedade Independente de Comunicação telenovelas
Portuguese-language telenovelas
Television shows set in Portugal